The Klingspor-Museum is a museum in Offenbach, Germany, specializing in the art of modern book production, typography and type. It includes a collection of fine art books from Karl Klingspor, one of the owners of Klingspor Type Foundry in Offenbach am Main, which inspired the museum's creation.

The collection
The museum hosts the work of famous type designers like Rudolf Koch, Otto Eckmann, Peter Behrens, Walter Tiemann, Rudo Spemann, Imre Reiner, Hans Bohn, Karlgeorg Hoefer, Ernst Schneidler, Werner Bunz and Georg Trump.

Paul Ritter donated his collection of Frans Masereel to the museum. 
Many works from other printing collections such as the Acorn Press, Bremer Presse, Cranach Presse, Doves Press, Edition Tiessen, Ernst Engel Presse (to name a few), are in the collection of the museum.

The library is open for visitors and holds several exhibitions each year.

See also 
 Museumsufer

External links 
 
 Archiv der internationalen Schriftdesigner / International Type Designer Archive at the Klingspor Museum

Design museums
Art museums and galleries in Germany
Typography
Libraries in Germany
Literary museums in Germany
Museums in Offenbach am Main
Printing museums in Germany